The South Prince of Wales Wilderness is a wilderness area on Prince of Wales Island, Alaska, protecting 90,968 acres of undeveloped Pacific temperate rainforest, much of which is old-growth. Managed by the United States Forest Service as part of the Tongass National Forest, the wilderness area was designated in a provision of the 1980 Alaska National Interest Lands Conservation Act. This wilderness contains 75 or more islands that range from a few to over 500 acres in size.  The South Prince of Wales Wilderness sees tidal bores, tidal surges, fierce winds, and heavy storms regularly.

References

ANILCA establishments
IUCN Category Ib
Protected areas of Prince of Wales–Hyder Census Area, Alaska
Wilderness areas of the Tongass National Forest